The Women's Flat Track Derby Association's North Central Region was formed in 2008 when WFTDA changed from having just two regional tournaments (East and West), to five, made up of teams from four regions: East, North Central, South Central and West.

Members in the central part of the Canada Region competed in the North Central Region.  For 2011, the region was reduced in size, with teams in Nebraska moving to the South Central Region.

WFTDA has now moved away from the Big 5 WFTDA Championships qualification tournament structure, last competed in 2012. Starting with the 2013 WFTDA season, the regions were discontinued in favour of an overall-rankings based system, and a new playoff format was created.

Member leagues

Former members

Rankings
Official WFTDA Regional Rankings as of January 29, 2013

Member teams unranked at this time:
 Circle City Derby Girls
 Glass City Rollers
 Little Steel Derby Girls
 McLean County MissFits
 Mississippi Valley Mayhem

Region Champions
 2009 - Windy City Rollers
 2010 - Windy City Rollers
 2011 - Windy City Rollers
 2012 - Windy City Rollers

Hydra Trophy winners produced
none

North Central Region titles won by league

See also
East Region
West Region
South Central Region

References

External links
North Central Regionals Tournament